Tityus pintodarochai is a species of scorpion belonging to the family Buthidae. It is only known from a single female collected in Paraná state, Brazil.

This is a medium-sized scorpion with a total length of around 50 mm. It is generally yellowish in colour, turning reddish towards the end of the tail. It can be distinguished from the widespread Tityus serrulatus by its lack of dark spots on the abdomen.

References

pintodarochai
Animals described in 2005
Scorpions of South America
Fauna of Brazil